"Who Do You Love" is a song performed by American contemporary R&B singer Bernard Wright, co-written by Wright and Lenny White. The song was issued as the first single from Wright's third studio album Mr. Wright. The song was his highest chart appearance on the Billboard R&B chart, peaking at #6 in 1985. The female vocalist was Marla Adler.

"Who Do You Love" was covered by The Winans in 1999, as well as by co-writer Lenny White in 1995. Since the song's release, it has been sampled in numerous other songs, including "Never Been in Love B4" by Shinehead, "If It Ain't Love" by Tichina Arnold, "Tell Me (I'll Be Around)" by Shades, "Who Is a Thug" by Big Pun and "Is It Kool?" by Luniz; as well as in the remix of "Loungin" by LL Cool J.

Music video

The official music video for the song was directed by Zbigniew Rybczyński.

Chart positions

References

External links
 
 

1985 songs
1985 singles
Bernard Wright songs
Manhattan Records singles
Music videos directed by Zbigniew Rybczyński
Song recordings produced by Marcus Miller
Song recordings produced by Lenny White
Songs written by Lenny White
Songs written by Bernard Wright